Marko Tadić (born 16 November 1953 in Tomislavgrad) is a Croatian mathematician.

Tadić does research in the field of noncommutative harmonic analysis, especially the representation theory of classical groups and classification of unitary representations and its interaction with the modern theory of automorphic forms through Langlands program.

Tadić graduated from the University of Zagreb with a B.S. in 1976, an M.S. in 1979, and a Ph.D. in 1980. He has been a full professor at the University of Zagreb since 1987. He has served two full-year appointments as a visiting professor at the University of Utah.

He is a fellow of the Croatian Academy of Sciences and Arts and a member of Academia Europaea.

References

External links
 Personal web page
 List of publications

1953 births
Croatian mathematicians
Croats of Bosnia and Herzegovina
Faculty of Science, University of Zagreb alumni
Academic staff of the University of Zagreb
Members of the Croatian Academy of Sciences and Arts
Members of Academia Europaea
Living people
Algebraists
Group theorists
Number theorists
People from Tomislavgrad
University of Utah faculty
International Mathematical Olympiad participants